Cecile Kramer (1911 – 1999) was an American screenwriter primarily known for her contributions to B-Westerns in the 1940s.

Biography 
Cecile was born in Cincinnati, Ohio, to Arthur Lewis and Bertha Davis. She assumed her stepfather Edward Kramer's last name when her mother remarried. The family moved west and settled in Los Angeles by the time Cecile and her half-sister Bertha were teenagers. By the 1940s, she was writing film scripts; one of her earliest sales was a Hopalong Cassidy script she co-wrote with Ellen Corby. Most of the films she wrote or co-wrote were penned for Harry Sherman's independent production company.

Selected filmography 

 Hoppy's Holiday (1947)
 Ramrod (1947)
 Buffalo Bill (1944)
 Silver Queen (1942)
 Twilight on the Trail (1941)

References 

1911 births
1999 deaths
Writers from Cincinnati
American women screenwriters
Screenwriters from Ohio
20th-century American women writers
20th-century American screenwriters